Walter L. Sickles High School is a public high school in Citrus Park, Florida, United States. Constructed in 1997, it was named for the superintendent of Hillsborough County Public Schools from 1989 to 1996.

Academics
As of 2010, Sickles High School was meeting the Adequate Yearly Progress mandated under the federal No Child Left Behind Act.

According to the Florida Department of Education's 2012-13 School Accountability report, Sickles was graded as an "A" school.

Student life

Athletics
The school sponsors interscholastic teams for boys and girls in basketball, cross country, golf, soccer, swimming, tennis, and track & field.  Young women may also compete in cheerleading, flag football, softball, and volleyball. Young men may also compete in baseball, football, Ice Hockey, and wrestling. Sickles High School football made it to the State Championships in 2013 and 2015. In 2015, Sickles won 1st Place.

Notable alumni
 John Henson, NBA basketball player
 Ray-Ray McCloud, NFL wide receiver

 Kenny Wilson, Major League Baseball player

References

External links
Sickles High School website
Hillsborough County Public Schools website

High schools in Tampa, Florida
Sickles
Public high schools in Florida
1997 establishments in Florida